There are over 9,000 Grade I listed buildings in England. This page is a list of these buildings in the district of Mid Devon in Devon.

Mid Devon

|}

Notes

External links

Mid Devon District
Lists of Grade I listed buildings in Devon